The I Army Corps / I AK was a corps level command of the Prussian and then the Imperial German Armies from the 19th Century to World War I.

It was established with headquarters in Königsberg (now Kaliningrad, Russia). Initially, the Corps catchment area comprised the entire Province of East Prussia, but from 1 October 1912 the southern part of the Province was transferred to the newly formed XX Corps District.

In peacetime, the Corps was assigned to the I Army Inspectorate, which became the 8th Army at the start of the First World War. The corps was still in existence at the end of the war, and was disbanded with the demobilisation of the German Army after World War I.

Austro-Prussian War 
The I Corps fought in the Austro-Prussian War against Austria in 1866, including the Battle of Trautenau and the Battle of Königgrätz.

Franco-Prussian War 
The Corps served in the Franco-Prussian War against France in 1870–1871. It saw action in the Battle of Noiseville, the Battle of Gravelotte, the Siege of Metz, the Battle of Amiens, the Battle of Hallue, and the Battle of St. Quentin, among other actions.

Peacetime organisation 

From formation in 1820, the Corps commanded two divisions: 1st Division and 2nd Division. These were joined by 37th Division when it was formed on 1 April 1899. 37th Division was transferred to XX Corps when it was formed on 1 October 1912.

The 25 peacetime Corps of the German Army (Guards, I - XXI, I - III Bavarian) had a reasonably standardised organisation. Each consisted of two divisions with usually two infantry brigades, one field artillery brigade and a cavalry brigade each. Each brigade normally consisted of two regiments of the appropriate type, so each Corps normally commanded 8 infantry, 4 field artillery and 4 cavalry regiments. There were exceptions to this rule:
V, VI, VII, IX and XIV Corps each had a 5th infantry brigade (so 10 infantry regiments)
II, XIII, XVIII and XXI Corps had a 9th infantry regiment
I, VI and XVI Corps had a 3rd cavalry brigade (so 6 cavalry regiments)
the Guards Corps had 11 infantry regiments (in 5 brigades) and 8 cavalry regiments (in 4 brigades).
Each Corps also directly controlled a number of other units. This could include one or more 
Foot Artillery Regiment
Jäger Battalion
Pioneer Battalion
Train Battalion

World War I

Organisation on mobilisation 
On mobilization on 2 August 1914, the Corps was restructured. The 1st and 2nd Cavalry Brigades were withdrawn to form part of the 1st Cavalry Division and the 43rd Cavalry Brigade was broken up and its regiments assigned to the divisions as reconnaissance units. The Divisions received engineer companies and other support units from the Corps headquarters. In summary, I Corps mobilised with 24 infantry battalions, 8 machine gun companies (48 machine guns), 8 cavalry squadrons, 24 field artillery batteries (144 guns), 4 heavy artillery batteries (16 guns), 3 pioneer companies and an aviation detachment.

Combat chronicle 
On mobilisation, I Corps was assigned to the 8th Army to defend East Prussia, while the rest of the Army executed the Schlieffen Plan offensive in August 1914. It saw action at the battles of Stallupönen, Gumbinnen, and Tannenberg, and the First Battle of the Masurian Lakes.

The Corps was still in existence at the end of the war.

Commanders 
The I Corps had the following commanders during its existence:

See also 

Franco-Prussian War order of battle
German Army order of battle (1914)
List of Imperial German infantry regiments
List of Imperial German artillery regiments
List of Imperial German cavalry regiments
Order of battle at Tannenberg

References

Bibliography 
 
 
 
 
 
 

Corps of Germany in World War I